Gods, Demons and Others is a collection of short stories by R. K. Narayan adapted from Indian history and mythology, including epics like The Ramayana and Mahābhārata. In this book, Narayan provides both vitality and an original viewpoint to ancient legends.

Introduction
"Gods, Demons and Others'' is a collection of ancient tales from India's complex history and mythology presented in their traditional setting, albeit with Narayan's urbane and affectionate, satirical style, bereft of any didactic interludes. The selection of stories includes only those that center on outstanding personalities who transcend the boundaries of time and age. The book consists of 15 stories.

Book outline
Lavana
The story of Lavana, an asura from the Ramayana.

Chudala
The story of a king trying to attain self-realisation.

Yayati
The story of Yayati, an asura king.

Devi
The story of the Goddess Devi, responsible for all, in Hindu mythology.

Viswamitra
Story of Viswamitra, one of the most revered rishis of ancient India, who attains enormous power but stays unsatisfied until he realizes that the power should not be used for self-gratification.

Manmata
Story of Manmata, the god of love

Ravana
Story of the asura king Ravana, Rama's nemesis in the Ramayana.

Valmiki
Story of Adi Kavi Valmiki, the author of the Ramayana who is said to have discovered the first śloka that set the base for Sanskrit poetry.

Draupadi
Story of Draupadi, the wife of the Pandavas in the Mahabharatha.

Nala
The story of how Nala a pure and righteous king is corrupted by a demon and thereby separated from his wife Damayanti. Nala subsequently overcomes all obstacles and is reunited with his kingdom and wife.

Savitri
The story of Savitri from Markandeya's narrative within the Mahabharatha.

The Mispaired Anklet
Story of Kannagi from the Tamil epic Silappathigaram. Kannagi is eulogized by that Tamil community for her purity and devotion to her husband.

Shakuntala
Story of Shakuntala the daughter of Viswamitra and wife of Dushyanta, the founder of the Paurav dynasty.

Harishchandra
Story of Harishchandra, the legendary Indian king.

Sibi
Story of the Chola king, Sibi Chakravarthy, who promises refuge to a dove and then sacrifices a part of his right thigh to a hawk, in return for the safety of the dove.

References

Short story collections by R. K. Narayan
Works based on the Mahabharata
1964 short story collections
Hindu mythology in popular culture
Viking Press books
Heinemann (publisher) books
Works based on the Ramayana